The davoch, davach or daugh is an ancient Scottish land measurement. All of these terms are cognate with modern Scottish Gaelic dabhach. The word dabh or damh means an "ox" (cf. oxgang, damh-imir), but dabhach can also refer to a "tub", so may indicate productivity. It was called the arachor in the Lennox.

It is thought that the measurement is of Pictish origins, and is most common in the north east, and often absent in the south of Scotland. It is particularly common in various placenames to this day, often in the form "Daugh of Invermarkie" etc. The name "Haddo" is also a corruption of “Hauf Daugh”, or half-davoch, in turn a translation of “leth-dhabhach”.

Scottish land measurements tended to be based on how much livestock they could support. This was particularly important in a country where fertility would vary widely. In the east a davoch would be a portion of land that could support 60 cattle or oxen. MacBain reckoned the davoch to be “either one or four ploughgates, according to locality and land”. A ploughgate contains about 100 Scots acres (5.3 km2).

Watson, in The Placenames of Ross & Cromarty, says, “usually four ploughgates”. Skene in Celtic Scotland says:

The pennyland is thought to be of Norse origin, so it is possible that Norse and native systems were conflated in the west.

Prof. MacKinnon in Place and Personal Names of Argyll says,

Daughs are referred to in the Book of Deer, and were recorded as being in use in the late 18th century in Inverness-shire. In some areas, a quarter of a davoch was a ploughgate, and an eighth an ochdamh.

See also
 Acre
 Obsolete Scottish units of measurement
 In the East Highlands:
 Rood
 Scottish acre = 4 roods
 Oxgang (Damh-imir) = the area an ox could plow in a year (around 20 acres)
 Ploughgate (?) = 8 oxgangs
 Daugh (Dabhach) = 4 ploughgates
 In the West Highlands:
 Groatland - (Còta bàn) = basic unit
 Pennyland (Peighinn) = 2 groatlands
 Quarterland (Ceathramh) = 4 pennylands (8 groatlands)
 Ounceland (Tir-unga) = 4 quarterlands (32 groatlands)
 Markland (Marg-fhearann) = 8 ouncelands (varied)
 Townland (Baile)
 Feddan - an Arabic land measurement following a similar line of thinking.

References
 (Dabhach) with corrections and additions

Further reading
 MacQueen, John, Pennyland and Doach in South Western Scotland: A Preliminary Note in Scottish Studies #23, (1979)

Obsolete Scottish units of measurement
Units of area